= Baileys Mills, Ohio =

Unincorporated community in Ohio, U.S.

Coordinates: 39°57′21″N 81°13′43″W

Baileys Mills is an unincorporated community in Belmont County, in the U.S. state of Ohio.

== History ==
A post office called Baileys Mills was established in 1857, and remained in operation until 1938. The community was named after Jesse Bailey, the proprietor of a local mill.
